Pehčevo Municipality is a municipality in the eastern part of North Macedonia. Pehčevo is also the name of the town where the municipal seat is found. This municipality is part of the Eastern Statistical Region.

Basic information
Pehčevo Municipality is located in the eastern part of North Macedonia between
41°06' and 41°53' latitude and
22°37' and 23°12' longitude.

It is bordered
to the east by the city of Sandanski in Bulgaria,
to south and west by Berovo Municipality and
to the north by Delčevo Municipality.

The municipality has a moderate continental climate with modification of the climate in the higher mountain and lowland parts.

The relief is mainly hilly-mountainous, with lowland terrains.

Demographics

According to the last national census from 2002, this municipality has 5,517 inhabitants.

Inhabited places and number of inhabitants by place

Pehčevo = 3,193
Umlena = 319
Robovo = 385
Čiflik = 309
Pančarevo = 395
Negrevo = 122
Crnik = 794
Spikovo = unknown
TOTAL = 5,517

Ethnic groups in the Municipality of Pehcevo

Macedonians = 4,737 (85.9%)
Roma = 390 (7.1%)
Turks = 357 (6.5%)
Others = 33 (0.6%)
TOTAL = 5,517

Employment and Unemployment

Employed
Male = 885
Female = 485
Total employed = 1,370

Unemployed
Male = 458
Female = 451
Total unemployed = 909

Agriculture and Rural Development

Agriculture

Livestock by inhabitant place

Cattle
Pehčevo = 190
Robovo = 510
Umlena = 194
Pančarevo = 276
Crnik = 100
Negrevo = 138
Čiflik = 144

Sheep
Pehčevo = 3000
Robovo = 1400
Umlena = 1441
Pančarevo = 1850
Crnik = 2130
Negrevo = 1120
Čiflik = 631

Poultry
Pehčevo = 977
Robovo = 1755
Umlena = 1234
Pančarevo = 2124
Crnik = 836
Negrevo = 617
Čiflik = 944

Goats
Pehčevo = 170
Robovo = 100
Umlena = 60
Pančarevo = 100
Crnik = 124
Negrevo = 50
Čiflik = 60

Orchards by inhabitant place

Plums
Pehčevo = 17000
Robovo = 7000
Umlena = 6000
Pančarevo = 11000
Crnik = 12000
Negrevo = 9000
Čiflik = 6000

Apples
Pehčevo = 3200
Robovo = 2000
Umlena = 1600
Pančarevo = 5300
Crnik = 5300
Negrevo = 400
Čiflik = 1300

Cheries
Pehčevo = 150
Robovo = 50
Umlena = 70
Pančarevo = 1000
Crnik = 1000
Negrevo = 70
Čiflik = 30

Sour cherries
Pehčevo = 1200
Robovo = 50
Umlena = 500
Pančarevo = 400
Crnik = 400
Negrevo = /
Čiflik = 400

Pears
Pehčevo = 150
Robovo = 400
Umlena = 300
Pančarevo = 800
Crnik = 800
Negrevo = 80
Čiflik = 80

Quinces
Pehčevo = /
Robovo = /
Umlena = /
Pančarevo = /
Crnik = /
Negrevo = 10
Čiflik = /

Walnuts
Pehčevo = 100
Robovo = 20
Umlena = 50
Pančarevo = 800
Crnik = 800
Negrevo = 100
Čiflik = 20

References

 
Municipalities of North Macedonia
Eastern Statistical Region